Gilbert Chapron (October 7, 1933 – September 5, 2016) was a French boxer, who competed in the middleweight division (– 75 kg) during his career as an amateur. He was born in Blois, Loir-et-Cher.

Amateur career
Chapron represented France as a Middleweight (75 kg) at the 1956 Melbourne Olympic games, capturing a bronze medal.

Olympic results 
1st round bye
Defeated Roger Rouse (United States) points
Lost to Ramón Tapia (Chile) points

References

External links
 databaseOlympics
 

1933 births
2016 deaths
Sportspeople from Blois
Middleweight boxers
Olympic boxers of France
Boxers at the 1956 Summer Olympics
Olympic medalists in boxing
French male boxers
Medalists at the 1956 Summer Olympics
Olympic bronze medalists for France